Elisabeth Clay is an American submission grappler, Brazilian jiu-jitsu practitioner and competitor.

Clay won multiple World and Pan championships titles (Gi and No-Gi) throughout her colored belts as well as the ADCC West Coat Trials when just a 16-year-old blue belt. She is a black belt 3X World No-Gi champion, a 4X Pan No-Gi champion as well as a World, European Open and Brazilian Nationals medallist. Clay is currently ranked No. 1 in the 2022–2023 IBJJF No-Gi black belt division.

Early life 
Elisabeth Ann Clay was born on June 10, 2000, in Katy, Texas, USA. when she was still a child her family moved to Oklahoma and then Alaska. From a family of competitive gymnasts Clay tried gymnastics before joining a local MMA gym at 12 where she started Brazilian jiu-jitsu.

Career

Early career 
In 2016, after competing at IBJJF World Championship in the juvenile blue belt division, winning gold in heavyweight and silver in the Absolute, Clay moved to Legacy Jiu Jitsu (an Ares Affiliate) in Anchorage, Alaska. Clay trained under coach Jordan Kontra and started competing in major tournaments. As a 16-year-old blue belt, Clay upset the bracket by winning 2017 ADCC Submission Grappling West Coat Trials. Clay started to be known as a "black belt killer" after defeating brown and black belt opponents. In 2018 she won medium heavy and the open class at Pan Championship then became absolute blue belt World champion. She was then promoted to purple belt.

Mid-2018, Clay moved to Modesto, California to train under Samir Chantre and Osvaldo Moizinho at the Ares Jiu-Jitsu Team headquarters. In February 2019 she arrived third in the 2nd ADCC North American Trial. In March 2019, Clay won double bronze at purple belt at the 2019 Pan Championship. In 2019, she won IBJJF World No-Gi Championship at brown belt, submitting all her opponents in the process. At Fight 2 Win 143 in June 2020 she defeated World No-Gi super-heavy and open weight black belt champion Kendall Reusing via Split Decision. At Fight 2 Win 147 in July 2020 Clay submitted 2x IBJJF world champion Luiza Monteiro via outside heel hook.

Black belt career 
In November 2020 she received her black belt from Moizinho and Chantre. In January 2021 FloGrappling chose her as the "2020 Female Grappler of the Year". In February she made her black belt Gi debut at Fight to Win 165 where she submitted no. 2-ranked medium heavyweight Maria Malyjasiak via toehold, winning in the process the welterweight Gi title.

In May 2021 at Subversiv 5 taking place in Miami in May, Clay won the Superfight submitting Andressa Cintra with a kneebar, a few weeks later Clay won silver at the Pan-American Championship then double gold at the 2021 Pan No-Gi with a 100% submission rate at both middleweight and in the absolute division, submitting Kendall Reusing in the openweight final. In October Clay won her first black belt world title at the 2021 World No-Gi Championship, also winning silver in openweight.

In April 2022 Clay participated in the ADCC West Coast Trials but lost on points to Amy Campo in the semi-final. In September she was invited to compete at the 2022 ADCC World Championship replacing Carina Santi, Clay lost on points to Amy Campo. At the 2022 Pan No-Gi taking place in October Clay won her weight and the openweight for the second year in a row after submitting all six of her opponent. 

Clay competed in the 2023 IBJJF European Championship, winning a bronze medal in the middleweight division. Clay is currently ranked No. 1 in the IBJJF No-Gi black belt division. She was then invited to compete in the women's under 66kg grand prix at Polaris 23 on March 11, 2023. Clay defeated Joanna Dineva, Ffion Davies, and Amy Campo in one night to win the tournament.

Championships and accomplishments 
Main Achievements (black belt level):
 4 x IBJJF Pan No-Gi Champion (2022 / 2021)
 3 x IBJJF World No-Gi Champion (2022 / 2021)
 3 x IBJJF American National (2022 / 2021)
 Polaris Under 66kg Grand Prix Champion (2023)
 IBJJF American National No-Gi Champion (2022)
 IBJJF Dallas International Open Champion (2021)
 SUBVERSIV Tournament Champion (2020)
 F2W Heavyweight Champion (2021)
 2nd place IBJJF World Championship (2021)
 2nd place IBJJF World No-Gi Championship (2021)
 2nd place IBJJF Pan Championship (2021)
 2nd place CBJJ Brazilian Nationals (2022)
 2nd place IBJJF American National (2022)
 2nd place Abu Dhabi Grand Slam Miami (2022)
 3rd place IBJJF European Open Championship (2023)

Main Achievements (colored belts ):
 4 x IBJJF World No-Gi Champion (2018 purple, 2019 brown)
 3 x IBJJF World Juvenile Champion (2016 / 2017)
 3 x IBJJF Pan No-Gi Champion (2018 blue, 2019 purple)
 2 x IBJJF World Champion (2018 blue)
 2 x IBJJF Pan Champion (2018 blue)
 2 x IBJJF Pan Juvenile Champion (2016)
 IBJJF Pan Championship No-Gi Champion (2019 purple)
 ADCC American Trials Champion (2017)
 2nd place IBJJF World Championship (2018 blue)
 2nd place IBJJF World Juvenile Championship (2016
 2nd place IBJJF Pan Championship Juvenile (2017)
 3rd place IBJJF Pan Championship (2019 purple)
 3rd place ADCC American Trials (2019)

Instructor lineage 
Mitsuyo Maeda > Carlos Gracie Sr. > Helio Gracie > Carlos Gracie Junior > Samir Chantre > Elisabeth Clay

Notes

References 

2000 births
American practitioners of Brazilian jiu-jitsu
Living people
People awarded a black belt in Brazilian jiu-jitsu
American submission wrestlers
Sportspeople from Alaska
World No-Gi Brazilian Jiu-Jitsu Championship medalists
Female Brazilian jiu-jitsu practitioners